Francesco Casolari (born 4 October 1965) is an Italian baseball player who competed in the 2004 Summer Olympics.

References

1965 births
Living people
Olympic baseball players of Italy
Baseball players at the 2004 Summer Olympics
Nettuno Baseball Club players
Grosseto Baseball Club players